Crimebuster or crime busters or variation, may refer to:

Comics 
Crimebuster (Boy Comics), alter-ego of Chuck Chandler, fictional boy hero of the 1940s-1950s
Crimebuster (Marvel Comics)
Crimebusters (DC Comics), a short-lived team appearing in Watchmen

Films 
 The Crimebusters, a 1961 crime film
 Crimebusters (film), a 1976 crime film 
 Crime Busters, a 1977 action-comedy film
 Crimebuster: A Son's Search for His Father (2012 film) award-winning documentary film by Lou Dematteis

Television
  Crime Buster (television series), 1968 UK television series
 "Crimebusters" (1989 TV episode), season 4 number 12 episode 62 of Perfect Strangers
 "Crimebusters" (1992 TV episode), season 5 number 2 episode 56 of ChuckleVision
 "Crimebusters" (2009 TV episode), season 19 number 13 episode 434 of Law & Order,

Other uses
 "CRIME BUSTER", cover art for the Evil Empire (1996) album cover
 Crimebusters, fictional characters from Mighty Mouse: The New Adventures
 Crimebusters FC, a soccer team from Eugu, Nigeria; from the Nigeria Nationwide League
The American series of The Three Investigators#Crimebusters (1989–1990)

See also 

 
 
 
 
 Crime Busters x 2, a 2008 Singaporean Chinese drama
 Crimebusters + Crossed Wires: Stories from This American Life, a compilation album
 Buster (disambiguation)
 Crime (disambiguation)
 Law enforcement